Darrell Hill (born August 17, 1993) is an American track and field athlete known for the shot put. His previous personal best of 21.16m was set just two weeks earlier at the Olympic Training Center in Chula Vista, California.

Hill's father was able to watch his son in the Olympics after a crowdfunding campaign was started by a passenger whom he met while driving for Uber.

Professional
Hill, sponsored by Nike, trained with USOC coach Art Venegas through 2017. Venegas is widely regarded as one of the best shot put coaches in the world, and is the only one to have athletes reach 73' with both the glide and rotational techniques. From 2018, Hill is coached by Gregory Garza based at San Diego State University through April 2020. In April 2020, Hill moved to Phoenix, Arizona to be coached by Ryan Whiting with professional group Desert High Performance.

Darrell placed 4th in 2017 opener in shot put at 2017 USA Indoor Track and Field Championships throwing 20.16m (66 ft 1.75 in).

The throw moved him to #13 of all time.

Hill won the US Shot Put title at 2018 USA Outdoor Track and Field Championships.

NCAA
Hill competed for Penn State University, finishing second at the 2015 NCAA Division I Outdoor Track and Field Championships before graduating with a degree in Rehabilitation and Human Service.  Earlier in that same year he finished fourth in the 2015 NCAA Division I Indoor Track and Field Championships.

Hill holds the Penn State school record indoors .  Olympic teammate Joe Kovacs holds the outdoor record  just ahead of Hill's .

Previously Hill competed for the University of Houston during his freshman year before transferring to Penn State University.

Hill placed 4th in the shot put at 2012 USA Junior Track and Field Championships at University of Indiana, Bloomington.

Prep
Born in Darby, Pennsylvania, Hill finished in second place at the 2011 PIAA Track and Field Championships in the shot put. In high school, Hill competed for Penn Wood High School in Lansdowne, Pennsylvania.

Hill grew up playing high school football, high school basketball, high school wrestling, and throwing shot put and discus (starting 2009).

See also
List of Pennsylvania State University Olympians

References

External links
 
 
 
 
 
 
 

1993 births
Living people
Sportspeople from Delaware County, Pennsylvania
Track and field athletes from Pennsylvania
People from Darby, Pennsylvania
Pennsylvania State University College of Health and Human Development alumni
Penn State Nittany Lions men's track and field athletes
Houston Cougars track and field
American male shot putters
Athletes (track and field) at the 2016 Summer Olympics
Olympic track and field athletes of the United States
Diamond League winners
USA Outdoor Track and Field Championships winners
Athletes (track and field) at the 2015 Pan American Games
Pan American Games track and field athletes for the United States
21st-century American people